Askhat Rasulovich Zhitkeyev (born 13 April 1981) is a Kazakh judoka. He won a silver medal at the 2008 Olympics in the –100 kg division and a bronze medal at the 2001 world judo championships in the –100 kg division. He won three bronze medals at the –100 kg category at the Asian Games.

References

External links
 
 
 

Kazakhstani male judoka
1981 births
Living people
Olympic judoka of Kazakhstan
Judoka at the 2000 Summer Olympics
Judoka at the 2004 Summer Olympics
Judoka at the 2008 Summer Olympics
Olympic silver medalists for Kazakhstan
Olympic medalists in judo
Asian Games medalists in judo
Medalists at the 2008 Summer Olympics
Judoka at the 2002 Asian Games
Judoka at the 2006 Asian Games
Asian Games bronze medalists for Kazakhstan
Medalists at the 2002 Asian Games
Medalists at the 2006 Asian Games
21st-century Kazakhstani people